The Women Health and Action Research Centre is a Nigerian non-profit and charitable organization based in Benin City, Edo State to promote reproductive health through research and advocacy.
The organization was founded in 1993 by Professor Friday Okonofua as a means to provide lasting solutions to female reproductive related problems.

The Women Health and Action Research Centre relies on public contributions and grants to fund its mission.
The continued research growth and development of the organization is dependent mostly on donations but the organization also increases its revenue by alternative means of funding such as grants and sponsorship.
In 2009, MacArthur Foundation awarded a research grant of $250,000 to the organization in support of research to improve policies and programs for promoting maternal health in six states of Nigeria.
Between 2002 and 2015, the Women Health and Action Research Centre had received a grant of $550,000 from the MacArthur Foundation.

References

2015 establishments in Nigeria
Health advocacy groups
Women in Nigeria
1993 establishments in Nigeria
Healthcare in Nigeria